Javier Ferreira is a former Paraguayan international footballer. He played for Paraguay in the 1990 World Cup qualifying campaign. Ferreira was also co-top scorer in the 1988 South American Youth Championship.

References 

1968 births
Paraguayan footballers
Living people
Association football midfielders
Paraguay international footballers